The Boston University Terriers women's hockey team will represent Boston University in the 2009–10 NCAA Division I women's ice hockey season. The Terriers are coached by Brian Durocher. Assisting Durocher are  Katie Lachapelle, Allison Coomey and Todd Langlais.

Offseason
June 15: The Boston University women's ice hockey team will add a group of seven newcomers to its 2009-10 roster. The Terriers will welcome forwards Jill Cardella, Taylor Holze, Shannon Mahoney and Cristina Wiley, defensemen Britt Hergesheimer and Kathryn Miller and goaltender Alissa Fromkin, a talented group from across North America.
June 24: Defenseman Amanda Shaw, who just completed a four-year career with the Boston University women's ice hockey team, has signed with a professional team in Switzerland and will also skate for Canada's national inline hockey team. Shaw will play for ZSC Lions in Zurich, a club in the Swiss women's professional ice hockey league.
August 17: Sophomores Jenelle Kohanchuk and Tara Watchorn of the Boston University women's ice hockey team have been named to the 2009-10 Canadian National Women's Under-22 team, Hockey Canada announced this weekend. The squad will participate in a three-game series against the Canadian National Team that will take place from August 17–20 at Father David Bauer Olympic Arena in Calgary.

Regular season
October 5: The Boston University women’s hockey team was ranked No. 10 in the country. The USCHO.com officials revealed it in their first Top-10 Women’s Hockey Poll of the season. BU accumulated 19 points.
On October 9, 2009, Boucher scored her first career goal and notched her first career multi-point game, as the Terriers defeated the Robert Morris Colonials by a 4-3 overtime tally.
November: Jill Cardella led all Hockey East rookies with nine points and six goals in league play. The freshman had a five-game point streak from Nov. 2 to Nov. 14, and had the game-winning goal in a 4-0 shutout of Vermont on Nov. 11, and scored the most goals (6) of any player in the month of November in league action.
February 17: Melissa Anderson of Boston University is among 45 nominees for the Patty Kazmaier Memorial Award.

Standings

Roster

Schedule

Player stats

Skaters

Goaltenders

Postseason
March 8:Sophomore Tara Watchorn scored at 9:52 in overtime as Number 3 seeded BU triumphed over No. 5 seed Connecticut. The game was played at Schneider Arena on the Providence College campus. The Terriers clinched their first ever Hockey East Tournament title and earned a spot in the NCAA Tournament. It was Watchorn’s second goal of the season. The 2010 Hockey East Tournament Championship game was the first ever to go into overtime in the eight-year history of the league.

NCAA hockey tournament
March 13: Mercyhurst's Bailey Bram scored two goals as the Lakers beat the Terriers by a score of 4-1.

Awards and honors
Melissa Anderson, 2010 WHEA Second-Team All-Star
Melissa Anderson, Frozen Four Skills Competition participant
Kasey Boucher, Hockey East Honor Roll (Oct. 12, 2009)
 Kasey Boucher, Hockey East Honor Roll (Feb. 15, 2010)
 Kasey Boucher, 2010 WHEA Honorable Mention All-Star
 Kasey Boucher, Hockey East Sportsmanship Award
 Jill Cardella – Boston University, Bauer Rookie of the Month, of the Month, November 2009
 Jill Cardella - Runner up, Hockey East Rookie of the Year
 Jill Cardella, 2010 WHEA All-Rookie Team
Melissa Haber, Frozen Four Skills Competition participant
 Jillian Kirchner, Hockey Player of the Week (Week of October 5)
 Ashley Leichliter - 2010 Turfer Athletic Award
Tara Watchorn, 2010 WHEA Second-Team All-Star
Tara Watchorn, New England Hockey Writers All-Star Team

Hockey East All-Tournament Team
Melissa Anderson, F: 2010 Women's Hockey East All-Tournament Team
Melissa Haber, G: 2010 Women's Hockey East All-Tournament Team
Melissa Haber, 2010 Women's Hockey East Tournament Most Valuable Player
Tara Watchorn, D: 2010 Women's Hockey East All-Tournament Team

Team awards
Lauren Cherewyk was presented with the Friends of Hockey Unsung Hero Award
Team Most Valuable Player award was shared between forward Melissa Anderson and goaltender Melissa Haber
Most Improved Player: Carly Warren.
Samantha Pulley was given the Caroline Bourdeau Spirit Award.
Academic Honors Award: Jenn Arms
Women's Ice Hockey Strength and Conditioning Athlete of the Year: Kasey Boucher

See also
2009–10 NCAA Division I women's ice hockey season

References

External links
Official Site

Boston University
Boston University Terriers women's ice hockey seasons